Urkish may mean:

Urkers dialect, the dialect spoken in Urk in the Netherlands
Urkesh, a city at the base of the Taurus Mountains in what is now northern Syria